Patrik Nordin (born 7 October 1971) is a Swedish ski mountaineer and cross-country skier.

Nordin was born in Södertälje and has been member of the national team since 2006. He started ski mountaineering in 1997 and competed first in the Swedish Cup race in Åre in the same year.

Selected results 
 2007:
 1st, Bix Storulvan team
 1st, Box Oppdal team
 6th, European Championship (relay race (together with John Bergstedt, André Jonsson and Joakim Halvarsson)
 2008:
 10th, World Championship (relay race (together with John Bergstedt, André Jonsson and Björn Gund)

External links 
 Patrik Nordin at skimountaineering.org

1971 births
Living people
People from Södertälje
Swedish male ski mountaineers
Swedish male cross-country skiers